Alain Israël, born on June 13, 1949, in Neuilly-sur-Seine, is a French researcher, director of research emeritus at the CNRS since 2014, and  a member of the French Academy of sciences.

Biography 
After studying at the University of Paris VII, he completed a thesis in virology at the University of Lyon in 1980, followed by 3 years of postdoctoral training at Stanford University, with Stanley Cohen. In 1983 he joined the laboratory directed by Philippe Kourilsky at the Pasteur Institute. In 1992 he took over the management of the Molecular Signaling and Cellular Activation Unit at the Pasteur Institute.

Scientific work 
The main objective of the research carried out by Israël and his team for more than twenty years has been cell signaling mechanisms in mammalian cells, focusing essentially on two signalling pathways: the NF-κB pathway and the Notch pathway.

Among his main discoveries are:

    Cloning of the first NF-κB subunit in 1990
    Cloning of NEMO, the main regulating subunit of the NF-κB track
    Identification of the first genetic disease related to a defect in the NF-κB pathway (collaboratively
    Identification of the first genetic disease related to a defect in the LUBAC ubiquitination complex (collaboratively)
    Characterization of the Notch pathway activation mode: 1) successive cleavages of the Notch receptor 2) the cleaved receptor is transported into the nucleus where it directly co-activates its target genes

Professor Alain Israël is the author of more than 150 scientific publications in internationally renowned journals;

Main distinctions 

 Director of Scientific Evaluation at the Institut Pasteur in 2000.
 Member of EMBO since 2000.
 Member of Academia Europaea since 2000.
 Member of the French Academy of sciences in 2004 in the Molecular and Cellular Biology - Genomics section.
 Chevalier of the Légion d'Honneur in 2008.
 Member of the CNRS Scientific Council from 2010 to 2014.

References

1949 births
People from Neuilly-sur-Seine
Pasteur Institute
French immunologists
French molecular biologists
Members of the French Academy of Sciences
Living people
Research directors of the French National Centre for Scientific Research